John Abel Smith (2 June 1802 – 7 January 1871) was a British Member of Parliament (MP) for Chichester and Midhurst.

He was the son of John Smith who preceded him as one of the members of parliament for Midhurst.

Smith married Anne Jervoise, the daughter of Sir Samuel Clarke Jervoise on 26 December 1827.  He was the father of Hugh Colin Smith and Dudley Robert Smith (1830-1897).

Smith was a founding partner of the Hong Kong-based trading company Jardine, Matheson and Co. and in 1835 became a partner in the merchant banking firm of Magniac, Smith & Co. along with partners Hollingworth Magniac and Oswald Smith at 3, Lombard Street, London. William Jardine agreed to make them agents for Jardines  with the proviso that "At no time shall it be expedient that we should give up the option of carrying on transactions with other London houses." In 1841 the bank was renamed Magniac, Jardine & Co. when William Jardine became a partner on his return to England.

In 1847, Smith sat on the Committee of the British Association for the Relief of Distress in Ireland and the Highlands of Scotland, which had been founded by his friend Lionel de Rothschild.

On 26 July 1858 Abel Smith and Lord John Russell, presented Lionel de Rothschild to the House of Commons.  The Commons then voted to allow Rothschild, as a Jew, to take the oath on the Old Testament only.

Abel Smith Street, in central Wellington, New Zealand, was named after him in 1840: he was a Director of the New Zealand Company
.

References

External links 
 

Members of the Parliament of the United Kingdom for English constituencies
1802 births
1871 deaths
UK MPs 1830–1831
UK MPs 1831–1832
UK MPs 1832–1835
UK MPs 1835–1837
UK MPs 1837–1841
UK MPs 1841–1847
UK MPs 1847–1852
UK MPs 1852–1857
UK MPs 1857–1859
John

Committee members of the Society for the Diffusion of Useful Knowledge